Confucius, also known as Bronze Statue of Confucius, Confucius Bronze Statue, Confucius Statue, and Great Confucius, is an outdoor 2009 bronze sculpture of the Chinese editor, philosopher, politician, and teacher of the same name by Willy Wang, installed in Hermann Park's McGovern Centennial Gardens in Houston, Texas, United States.

History
The statue was dedicated at Hermann Park as a gift from China to Houston on September 26, 2009, commemorating the 2,560th anniversary of the Confucius' birth and the 30th anniversary of the establishment of diplomatic relations between China and the United States. Ceremony attendees included Houston City Councilwoman Wanda Adams, Minister Liu Guangyuan of the Embassy of China to the United States, Mayor Pro Tem of Houston Sue Lovell, Wang, First Lady of Houston Andrea White, Consul General Gao Yanping, and representatives from Friends of Confucius Sculpture for Hermann Park and Houston Parks and Recreation. Nearly 600 people from the Chinese Consulate General in Houston, the city government, consular corps, and Chinese community were also in attendance.

See also
 2009 in art
 List of public art in Houston

References

2009 establishments in Texas
2009 sculptures
Asian-American culture in Houston
Bronze sculptures in Texas
Chinese-American culture in Texas
Cultural depictions of Confucius
Hermann Park
Monuments and memorials in Texas
Outdoor sculptures in Houston
Sculptures of men in Texas
Statues in Houston
Statues of writers